This is the list of television programmes broadcast in Estonia. The list is incomplete.

See also 
 List of Estonian radio programs

References 

 
Estonia
Television programs